fi is the debut studio album by English record producer Bibio (Stephen Wilkinson). It was released on Mush Records in February 2005, and reissued by Warp Records in 2015.

Track listing

References

External links
fi at Mush Records

2004 debut albums
Bibio albums
Mush Records albums